EasyPizza (styled as easyPizza) was a short-lived pizza delivery franchise launched on 17 December 2004, owned by EasyGroup.

Overview
easyPizza offered a restricted menu and prices that varied according demand. Cheaper pizzas were offered during off-peak periods and could command a premium during popular times. Additional discounts were obtained by ordering in advance rather than for immediate delivery. The pizzas were not freshly made but manufactured centrally then cooked from frozen, limiting customisation.

History
EasyGroup lost a High Court case against EasyPizza, a previously existing London-based pizza delivery chain who successfully accused EasyGroup of bullying and underhanded practices.

As of 2017, the only option offered through the easypizza.com site was a re-direct to Domino's Pizza's website. Previously easyPizza had slated Domino's as a "big pizza rip-off". In March 2018 a separate website, easy.pizza was registered to People's Pizza Ltd; this is linked to People's Coffee Ltd, licensee of the easyCoffee marque. easyPizza and easyCoffee vending machines were displayed together a franchise exhibition in October 2018 suggesting plans to revive the pizza brand.

References

External links

easy.pizza 

Pizza chains of the United Kingdom
Online food ordering
EasyGroup